Abu Bakr al-ʿAydarūs, also known as Sayyid Abū Bakr al-ʿAdanī ibn ʿAbd Allāh al-ʿAydarūs (1447–1508) was a Hadhrami religious scholar of sufism and a poet of wrote several Arab poems in vernacular style. Abu Bakr led most of his adult life in Aden, where he was well respected for his societal contributions to the well-being of the city's residents. After his death in 1508, he was mourned by the city's residents, and was later venerated as the wali or "patron saint" of Aden.

Biography

Abu Bakr was born in Tarim in 1447. In his youth, Abu Bakr studied the teachings of Al-Ghazali, and in his early adulthood, he was sent to Aden to undertake missionary duties there. Abu Bakr oversaw the construction of the city's mosque and its Sufi school, and later settled down in the city. Nevertheless, he made occasional return trips to his family in  Tarim, many of whom relied on monetary endowment given by   charitable traders in the region.

His lineage is recorded as follows: He is Abu Bakr al-Adani bin Abd Allah al-Aydarus, bin Abu Bakr al-Sakran, bin Abd al-Rahman al-Saqqaf, bin Muhammad Mawla al-Dawilah, bin Ali Mawla al-Darak, bin Alawi al-Ghayur, bin Muhammad al-Faqih al-Muqaddam, bin Ali, bin Muhammad Sahib al-Mirbat, bin Ali Khali Qasam, bin Alawi al-Thani, bin Muhammad Sahib al-Sawma'ah, bin Alawi al-Awwal, bin Ubayd Allah, bin Ahmad al-Muhajir, bin Isa al-Rumi, bin Muhammad al-Naqib, bin Ali al-Uraydi, bin Ja'far al-Sadiq, bin Muhammad al-Baqir, bin Ali Zayn al-Abidin, bin Husayn, bin Ali bin Abi Talib and Fatimah al-Zahra, the daughter of Muhammad.

Abu Bakr was eventually made the Mansab (religious leader) of Aden. He was highly respected by the city's residents, who described him as a very brilliant and kind man with an excellent sense of justice. Abu Bakr was also respected by members of the local Jewish community, who provided refuge to the Jews who suffer from occasional harassment from the desert bandits. Abu Bakr also travelled to Harar after settling in Aden and introduced the Qadiriyya Tariqa among the Ethiopian natives.

Introduction of coffee
At least three Arab texts, namely the Ta'rikh of an-Najm al-Ghazzi, the Jāmiʻ karamāt al-awlīyāʼ of Yūsuf ibn Ismāʻīl Nabhānī and Istifa' al-Safwa li-Tashyat al-Qahwa, mention Abu Bakr's role in the introduction of coffee to the Hadhramaut. According to the Ta'rikh of an-Najm al-Ghazzi, Abu Bakr became impressed with the strong stimulating effect of the coffee fruit after he ate the berries of a coffee tree during his wanderings. He praised the effects of the coffee fruit, took the coffee berries and introduced them to his disciples. The other two sources, Jāmiʻ karamāt al-awlīyāʼ and the Istifa' al-Safwa li-Tashyat al-Qahwa mentioned of Abu Bakr's fondness of coffee and accredited him for the introduction of coffee to South Arabia.

Death and legacy

Abu Bakr's death in 1508 (although some source suggested that he died in 1503) was greatly mourned by the Adenis. The city residents published copies of obituaries commemorating the life of Abu Bakr, and an account of Abu Bakr's birthplace, Tarim was also published. His grave has since been visited by thousands of Muslim pilgrims every year who continue to pay their respects.

Aidarus mosque

Several people alleged the Abu Bakr may have possessed mystical powers and claimed that they had met his spirit while sleeping; a legend mentioned of a Sikh traveller who met Abu Bakr in his dream shortly after Abu Bakr's demise. The Sikh, who was suffering from a stomachache, fell asleep beside his tomb. In his dream, Abu Bakr instructed the Sikh to bathe in a nearby pond and he quickly recovered. Following the ordeal, the grateful Sikh built a mosque over Abu Bakr's grave and shortly before returning to India, he gave a promise to the local residents that he would provide the doors for the newly constructed mosque. The Sikh met Abu Bakr again after his return to India, who narrated to Abu Bakr of his difficulty of bringing wood to Yemen for the construction of the mosque's doors. Abu Bakr  provided instructions to the Sikh on the fate of the wooden logs, to which he duly followed and threw them into the sea. Residents at Sira later reported of receiving the wooden logs which the Sikh had thrown into the sea, and noted an inscription which stated the intended use of the wooden logs. The mosque later became the centre of Sufi learning in Aden, and several of his descendants took on the duty of the mosque's custodians. Renovations works were initiated during the 19th century and again in the 1990s, after the mosque suffered serious structural damage from the North Yemen Civil War.

Descendants
After relocating to Aden, Abu Bakr raised a family of his own and started off a new lineage. The al-ʿAydarūs clan was an offshoot of the Ba 'Alawiyya as-Saqqaf clan of Tarim. Many of his descendants established trading links with the Bedouins and the Qu'aiti sultans and took up prominent political positions. Other descendants migrated to India, Southeast Asia and East Africa from the late 14th century onwards and established new Islamic schools or Muslim ruling houses; among the first descendants to migrate was a grandson, ʿAbd Allāh al-ʿAydarūs and another descendant, ʿAbdallāh ibn Shaykh al-ʿAydarūs, who migrated to India and Aceh, respectively, and established new diaspora communities.

See also
Ali al-Uraydi

Notes

References

 Anne K. Bang, Sufis and Scholars of the Sea: Family Networks in East Africa, 1860-1925, Routledge, 2003, 
 Azyumardi Azra, The origins of Islamic reformism in Southeast Asia: networks of Malay-Indonesian and Middle Eastern 'Ulamā' in the seventeenth and eighteenth centuries, Allen & Unwin, 2004, 
 Daniel McLaughlin, Yemen, Bradt Travel Guides, 2008, 
 Engseng Ho, The Graves of Tarim: Genealogy and mobility across the Indian Ocean, University of California Press, 2006, 
 J. Spencer Trimingham, John O. Voll, The Sufi Orders in Islam, Oxford University Press, 1998, 
 John Obert Voll, Islam, Continuity and Change in the Modern World: Continuity and Change in the Modern World, Westview Press, 1982
 José-Marie Bel, Théodore Monod, Aden: Port mythique du Yémen, Maisonneuve & Larose, 1998, 
 M. Hasyim Assagaf, Derita putri-putri Nabi: Studi historis Kafa'ah Syarifah, Remaja Rosdakarya, 2000, 
 M. Th Houtsma, E.J. Brill's first encyclopaedia of Islam, 1913–1936, published by BRILL, 
 Muhammad ibn Aḥmad Nahrawālī, Clive K. Smith, Lightning Over Yemen: A History of the Ottoman Campaign (1569-71) : Being a Translation from the Arabic of Part III of Al-Barq Al-Yamānī Fī Al-Fatḥ Al-ʻUthmānī by Quṭb Al-Din Al-Nahrawālī Al-Makkī as Published by Ḥamad Al-Jāsir,  I.B. Tauris, 2002, 
 Petrus Voorhoeve, Handlist of Arabic Manuscripts in the Library of the University of Leiden and Other Collections in the Netherlands, Rijksuniversiteit te Leiden, Bibliotheek Staff, 1980, 
 Reuben Ahroni, The Jews of the British Crown Colony of Aden: History, Culture, and Ethnic Relations, BRILL, 1994, 
 Rex S O'Fahey, Hussein Ahmed, The Writings of the Muslim Peoples of Northeastern Africa, BRILL, 2003, 
 Roger Allen, Donald Sidney Richards, Arabic Literature in the Post-classical Period, Cambridge University Press, 2006, 
 Ulrike Freitag, W. G. Clarence-Smith, Hadhrami Traders, Scholars, and Statesmen in the Indian Ocean, 1750s-1960s, BRILL, 1997, 
 Zaka Hanna Kour, The History of Aden, 1839-72, Routledge, 1981, 

1447 births
1508 deaths
A
Muslim missionaries
Hadhrami people
Hashemite people
Yemeni Sufi religious leaders
Yemeni Sufi saints
Yemeni poets
15th-century Arabs